Lee O'Connor is a British illustrator and comics artist. He has produced the art for Heavy Metal, Seer, Confessional and Vurt.

Bibliography

Comics 
 Vurt (with Jeff Noon)
 Seer (with Gary Simpson, Engine Comics, 2003)
 The Confessional (with Chris McCay, Warpton, 2004)
 'Sky Heroes (with Jim Massey, Commercial Suicide anthology, 2005)
 Defective Comics (with Alex de Campi, 2005)
 Contract Blues (with Mike Fugere, Ronin Studios, 2006)
 Iraq: Operation Takeover (with Sean Michael Wilson, graphic novel, War on Want/Boychild Productions, June 2007)
 'Finite (with Andrew Dabb, in Space Doubles, Th3rd World Studios, 2008)
 'Another Room with Sam Costello, Split Lip, 2008) 
 'Control''' (with Kieron Gillen, in Phonogram: The Singles Club #3, Image Comics, June 2009)
 'The Ayatollah's Son: STARS (with Pat Mills, in Ctrl.Alt.Shift Unmasks Corruption, 2009)
 The City of Abacus (with V V Brown & David Allain, 2010)
 'The Spirit and the Flesh (with Josef Rother, in Heavy Metal magazine, January 2010)
 Raven's Gate (adapted by Tony Lee from the book by Anthony Horowitz, 160 page graphic novel, Walker Books, 2010)Evil Star (adapted by Tony Lee from the book by Anthony Horowitz, 170 page graphic novel, Walker Books, 2014)Bartkira: Nuclear Edition (Floating World, May 2016)'It's Good to be Back comic for the Metronomy album Small World, February 2022)

 Tabletop Games 

 Exalted: Third Edition (Oynx Path Publishing, 2016)
 Trinity Continuum: Project Aberrant (Oynx Path Publishing, 2021)
 Trinity Continuum: Novas Worldwide (Oynx Path Publishing, 2022)
 Trinity Continuum: Adventure!'' (Oynx Path Publishing, 2023)

Magazines 

 Delayed Gratification 
 MAGAZ

Notes

References

External links

Review of The Confessional, Comics Bulletin
Reviews of Seer
Another Seer review

Artists from Devon
Living people
1982 births